New York City is an album by the Peter Malick Group featuring Norah Jones. It was recorded during August and September 2000, a few weeks before Jones made her own demos for Blue Note Records, and released three years later. Jones performs vocals on all seven tracks, and this album is more bluesy than Jones' debut album, Come Away with Me. One of the tracks of the album, "Strange Transmissions", was bundled with the Nokia 6230 mobile phone.

The album reached number 54 on the Billboard 200, number one on the Top Blues Albums chart, and number two on the Top Independent Albums chart. The Bastone & Burnz remix of "Strange Transmissions" peaked at number 23 on the Hot Dance Music/Club Play chart in June 2004.

The cover version of Bob Dylan's "Heart of Mine" was featured in the 2003 film Runaway Jury, being used in the closing credits.

Track listing

Personnel
Credits adapted from the liner notes of New York City.

 Peter Malick – guitars, production ; vocals 
 Norah Jones – vocals ; piano 
 Eric Gardner – drums 
 Marty Richards – drums 
 Danny McGouch – Mellotron ; Hammond B-3 ; Wurlitzer piano 
 Mike Thompson – piano ; accordion 
 Tom West – piano 
 Jeff Turmes – bass 
 Hugh Fordin – executive production
 Ducky Carlisle – recording, mixing
 Bruce Witkin – additional engineering
 Nate Dubé – additional engineering
 Alan Silverman – mastering at Arf! Digital (New York City)
 Jeff Chenault – art direction, design

Charts

Certifications

Notes

References

2003 albums
E1 Music albums
Norah Jones albums